Neu-Thierstein Castle is a ruined castle in the Swiss municipality of Büsserach in the canton of Solothurn, Switzerland.

History
The castle was founded in 1100 and a new building was built around 1294/95.  The castle was apparently built by the Saugern-Pfeffingen family as a seat for a Kastvogtei (or a vogt with authority over a religious structure) who ruled over Beinwil Abbey.  The first mention of the castle comes from 1321 when it was called Bello.  As heirs of the Saugern-Pfeffingen family, in the late 12th Century, the count of Thierstein took over the castle and the Kastvogtei post.  By 1400 it was known as Thierstein Castle.  The castle was occupied by the Canton of Solothurn in 1445, 1467 and 1499.  After the extinction of the counts of Thierstein in 1522, Solothurn acquired the castle and made it the administrative center of the secular bailiwick of Thierstein.  In 1798 the castle was sold for demolition.  However, in the 19th Century, the destruction of the castle are stopped by private individuals who wanted to repair the ruins.  The ruins were surveyed and archeologically investigated in 1985.

Castle site
The castle ruins are on a small rocky outcrop above the municipality of Büsserach.  The ruin consists of a residential tower with ancillary buildings.  Traces of a bailey and the old gate house on the south side can still be seen.

See also
 List of castles and fortresses in Switzerland

References

Castles in the canton of Solothurn
Ruined castles in Switzerland